Joseph Turner may refer to:

 J. M. W. Turner (1775–1851), British landscape painter
 Joseph Turner (loyalist) (1701–1783), prominent figure in colonial and revolutionary Pennsylvania
 Joseph Turner (priest) (1746–1828), Dean of Norwich, 1790–1828
 Joseph Turner (architect) (died 1807), flourished in Cheshire in the late 18th century
 Joseph Turner (Wisconsin politician) (died 1874), assemblyman from Wisconsin
 Joseph Hudson Turner (1872–1937), Wrexham A.F.C. and Wales international footballer

See also
 Joe Turner (disambiguation)